Melindea ferruginipes is a species of leaf beetle of the Democratic Republic of the Congo and Ivory Coast, described by Julius Weise in 1924.

References 

Eumolpinae
Beetles of Africa
Beetles of the Democratic Republic of the Congo
Insects of West Africa
Taxa named by Julius Weise
Beetles described in 1924